The Leżajsk Brewery is one of Poland's oldest breweries and belongs to the Żywiec Group. Żywiec Group has five main breweries: Żywiec Brewery, Elbrewery, Leżajsk Brewery, Cieszyn Brewery and Warka Brewery, and is majority owned by the Dutch Heineken Group. The brewery is located in the historic downtown of Leżajsk.

Beer
The company claims that in 1525 Polish King Sigismund I the Old granted the town Leżajsk the exclusive right to brew beer.

Since its recent upgrades, it is estimated that the brewery has a capacity of 1.85 million hl a year. Leżajsk constitutes for 17% of Grupa Żywiec's output. The company has three different brews: Leżajsk Pełne, Leżajsk Chmielowe Pils, and Leżajsk Niepasteryzowane. The last of which has won several awards, including Eurobeer 1995, Polagra and Chmielaki. The brewery also makes Tatra Jasne Pełne and Tatra Mocne.

Logo
The Lezajsk's logo features a blue and red shield with a cursive L on the foreground.

See also
Polish beer
Żywiec Brewery
Elbrewery
Warka Brewery
Cieszyn Brewery

References

External links

Breweries of Poland
Beer brands of Poland
Heineken subsidiaries
Heineken brands
Leżajsk County
1525 establishments in Poland